Pachama is a village in the Arica and Parinacota Region, Chile.

Populated places in Parinacota Province